The first season of Australian drama television series Prisoner (commonly known as Prisoner: Cell Block H) premiered on the then-known 0-10 Network on 26 February 1979 in Sydney and 27 February 1979 in Melbourne. The season contains 79 episodes and concluded on 28 November 1979.

Cast

Main 

 Patsy King as Erica Davidson
 Fiona Spence as Vera Bennett
 Peta Toppano as Karen Travers
 Kerry Armstrong as Lynn Warner
 Val Lehman as Bea Smith
 Carol Burns as Franky Doyle
 Elspeth Ballantyne as Meg Jackson
 Colette Mann as Doreen Anderson
 Sheila Florance as Lizzy Birdsworth
 Margaret Laurence as Marilyn Mason
 Mary Ward as Jeanette "Mum" Brooks
 Barry Quin as Greg Miller
 Richard Moir as Eddie Cook
 Don Barker as Bill Jackson
 Christine Amor as Jean Vernon
 Jim Smillie as Steve Wilson
 Lesley Baker as Monica Ferguson
 Gerard Maguire as Jim Fletcher

Central supporting 

 Amanda Muggleton as Chrissie Latham
 Sigrid Thornton as Roslyn Coulson
 Monica Maughan as Pat O'Connell

Recurring 

 Ronald Korosy as Marty Jackson
 Kirsty Child as Anne Yates
 Arianthe Galani as Mrs Bentley
 Anne Charleston/Gabrielle Hartley as Lorraine Watkins 
 Billie Hammerberg as Valerie Richards
 Ann-Maree McDonald as Rosie Hudson
 Kim Deacon as Judith-Ann Watkins
 Louisa Pajo as Helen Masters
 Brandon Smith as James Brandon
 Frank Gallacher as Mr Bentley 
 John Arnold as Doug Parker
 Terry Gill as Detective Inspector Jack Grace
 Beverly Dunn as Ethel Warner
 Ben Gabriel as Ted Warner
 Carmel Millhouse as Mary Healy/McCauley
 Patricia Kennedy as Miss McBride
 Sally Cahill as Barbara Davidson
 Margo McLennan as Catherine Roberts
 Tim Elliott as Ken Roberts
 Andrea Butcher as Sarah Roberts
 Penelope Stewart as Kathleen Leach
 Briony Behets as Susan Rice
 Bill Hunter as George Lucas
 David Bradshaw as Jason Richards/Frederick Rice
 Bryon Williams as Dr. Weissman
 Betty Lucas as Clara Goddard
 Joy Westmore as Joyce Barry
 Jude Kuring as Noeline Bourke
 Brian Granrott as Col Bourke
 Tracey-Jo Riley as Leanne Bourke
 Joanne Lehman as Yvonne

 Deborra-Lee Furness as Connie
 Maria Mercedes as Irene Zervos
 Lakis Kanzipas as Alex Zervos 
 Nadia Tass as Tessa Zervos
 Theo Tsalkitzakos as Stavros
 Judy Nunn as Joyce Martin
 Terry Emery as Vince
 Peter Finlay as Mac
 Judith Woodroffe as Julie Barker
 Penny Ramsay as Leila Fletcher
 Gary Files as Fred Ferguson
 Lynda Keane as Denise Crabtree ("Blossom")
 Kate Jason as Martha Eaves
 Carrillo Gantner as Peter Clements
 Colleen Clifford as Edith Wharton
 Lulu Pinkus as Melinda Cross
 Hu Pryce as Tom Burton
 Judith McGrath as Colleen Powell
 Reylene Pearce as Phyllis Hunt
 Judith Roberts as Carol Burton
 Liddy Clark as Bella Albrecht
 Robin Cuming as Jack Crosse
 Burt Cooper as Terry Mansini
 Pat Bishop as Antonia McNally
 Roz French as Glenys Buchanan
 Jeanie Drynan as Angela Jeffries
 Ian Smith as Ted Douglas
 Anne Hardy as Alice Hemmings
 David Letch as David O'Connell
 Rosie Sturgess as Mrs. Devlin
 Geoff Collins as Alex Fraser
 George Spartels as Herbie
 Ray Meagher as Geoff Butler

Episodes

Reception

Viewership 
In 1979, Prisoner was the second most popular program in Australia, averaging at 1,494,000 viewers.

Accolades 
 Penguin Award for Best Sustained Actress in a series – Carol Burns (1979)
 Logie Award for Best Lead Actress in a Series – Carol Burns (1980)
 Logie Award for Best New Drama Series – Prisoner (1980)

Home media 

Select episodes from season one are available on both VHS and DVD formats.

Notes

References 

1979 in Australian television